Eutaxia myrtifolia is shrub species in the family Fabaceae. It is endemic to Western Australia. Plants may be prostrate or up to 2 metres high. Yellow and red flowers are produced throughout the year in the species' native range. It occurs in woodland, shrubland and heath in the coastal region between Cape Naturaliste and Cape Arid.

The species has a reputation as a reliable shrub in cultivation where it has usually been known by the names of Dillwynia obovata or Eutaxia obovata. It is well suited to being grown in rockeries, containers, or other situations providing good drainage. It is resistant to mild frosts and can be grown in coastal areas, with some protection. Pruning after flowering promotes more compact growth. Cultivated plants usually range between 0.75 and 1 metre high, and slightly less in width. Plants may be propagated from cuttings or scarified seed.

References

 

myrtifolia
Fabales of Australia
Rosids of Western Australia